Mogens Lassen (20 February 1901 – 14 December 1987) was a Modernist Danish architect and designer, working within the idiom of the International Style. He mainly designed residential buildings, both in the form of single-family houses and apartment blocks. He was the brother of Flemming Lassen, also an architect.

Biography

Mogens Lassen was born on 20 February 1901 in Copenhagen into an artistic family. His father Hans Vilhelm Lassen was a decorative painter and his mother, Ingeborg Winding, was a painter. He trained as a mason before being admitted to the Royal Danish Academy of Fine Arts in 1923, but underwent further architectural training at various practices in Copenhagen, particularly with Tyge Hvass from 1925 to 1934. During a stay in Paris in 1927 to 1928, where he worked for the Danish company Christiani & Nielsen, he became acquainted with Le Corbusier's revolutionary works which inspired him to design innovative modern houses in reinforced concrete on his return to Denmark. He set up his own practice in 1935.

Furniture
In addition to his architectural work, Lassen was also a keen furniture designer. As a result of his fine craftsmanship and his search for simplicity, his steel-based furniture from the 1930s added a new dimension to the modernist movement. His later designs in wood still form part of classical Danish Modern, especially his three-legged stool and folding Egyptian coffee table (1940) originally produced by A. J. Iversen.

See also
 Functionalism (architecture)
 Architecture of Denmark

References

External links

 Images from Klampenborg
 Article
 Source

Danish furniture designers
Architects from Copenhagen
Designers from Copenhagen
1901 births
1987 deaths
Royal Danish Academy of Fine Arts alumni
Danish modern
Recipients of the C.F. Hansen Medal
20th-century Danish architects